Al-Rashid Mausoleum is a historical mausoleum in Isfahan, Iran. It dates back to the Seljukid era and is located on the northern bank of Zayanderud beside the Shahrestan bridge. This structure is the burial place of Al-Rashid,  the 30th Abbasid caliph, who left his palace and fled from Baghdad to Isfahan, when Mahmud II captured Baghdad. Two years later, Al-Rashid was stabbed and killed by Hashshashins in 1138. The only decorative element of the mausoleum is a stucco Kufic inscription.

See also
List of the historical structures in the Isfahan province

References 

Buildings and structures completed in the 12th century
Mausoleums in Isfahan
Burial sites of the Abbasid dynasty